Edmond Faure (5 June 1927 – 13 February 2008) was a French wrestler. He competed at the 1948 Summer Olympics and the 1952 Summer Olympics.

References

External links
 

1927 births
2008 deaths
French male sport wrestlers
Olympic wrestlers of France
Wrestlers at the 1948 Summer Olympics
Wrestlers at the 1952 Summer Olympics
Sportspeople from Clermont-Ferrand
20th-century French people